Hikmat Mizban Ibrahim al-Azzawi (1933 – January 27, 2012) was an Iraqi politician who was a Deputy Prime Minister and twice Minister of Finance under the government of Saddam Hussein.

Azzawi originally trained as an economist. He was arrested in 1960 protesting against the government of Iraqi General Abd al-Karim Qasim. He joined the Arab Socialist Ba'ath Party in 1968 and was named undersecretary of state for Commerce. He was fired from all his official designations in 1982 and demised to low administrative job and expelled from the party, until the 1985 when he became Governor of the Central Bank of Iraq, in April, 1987 he was humiliated in a public meeting and severely dismissed due to refusing the transfer a large sum of money at the demand of one of the President's uncles.

President Saddam Hussein forced him back into the position of Minister of Finance in 1995.

In July 1999, he was given the honorary title of Deputy Prime Minister. After the United States-led Invasion of Iraq in 2003, he was listed as number 45 (8 of Diamonds) on the Iraqi most-wanted playing cards. He was peacefully detained from his house in Baghdad on April 19, 2003 by Iraqi police and handed over to the US military.

He died, aged 79, in prison due to lack of his heart medications. A government spokesman said his health had been deteriorating because of aging, although another cited cancer as the cause of death.

References

Government ministers of Iraq
Arab Socialist Ba'ath Party – Iraq Region politicians
Governors of the Central Bank of Iraq
Finance ministers of Iraq
1933 births
2012 deaths
Iraqi people who died in prison custody
Prisoners and detainees of the United States military
Prisoners who died in Iraqi detention
Most-wanted Iraqi playing cards
Iraq War prisoners of war
Iraqi prisoners of war